The following were the scheduled events of sailing for the year 2016 throughout the world.

Events

Olympic classes events

Olympic Games
7–20 August: 2016 Summer Olympics in Rio de Janeiro, Brazil
Men's 470
 : 
 : 
 : 
Women's 470
 : 
 : 
 : 
Men's 49er
 : 
 : 
 : 
Women's 49er FX
 : 
 : 
 : 
Men's Finn
 : 
 : 
 : 
Men's Laser
 :  
 : 
 :  
Women's Laser Radial
 : 
 : 
 : 
Mixed Nacra 17
 : 
 : 
 : 
Men's RS:X
 :  
 :  
 : 
Women's RS:X
 : 
 : 
 :

World championships
9–14 February: 49er & 49er FX World Championships in Clearwater, United States
Men's 49er
 : 
 : 
 : 
Women's 49er FX
 : 
 : 
 : 
20–27 February: RS:X World Championships in Eilat, Israel
Men's RS:X
 : 
 : 
 : 
Women's RS:X
 : 
 : 
 : 
20–27 February: 470 World Championships in San Isidro, Argentina
Men's 470<
 : 
 : 
 : 
Women's 470
 : 
 : 
 : 
12–20 April: Laser Radial World Championships in Nuevo Vallarta, Mexico
 : 	
 : 
 : 
5–15 May: Finn Gold Cup in Gaeta, Italy
 : 
 : 
 : 
10–18 May: Laser World Championship in Nuevo Vallarta, Mexico
 : 	
 : 
 :

Sailing World Cup
7 December 2015 – 11 December 2016: 2016 ISAF Sailing World Cup
23–30 January: Sailing World Cup Miami in Miami, United States
25–1 May: Sailing World Cup Hyères in Hyères, France
6–12 June: Sailing World Cup Weymouth in Weymouth & Portland, United Kingdom
19–25 September: Sailing World Cup Qingdao in Qingdao, China
4–11 December: Sailing World Cup Final in Melbourne, Australia

African championships
12–17 January: 470 African Championships in Cape Town, South Africa
 : 
 : 
 :

European championships
26 February – 4 March: Laser European Championships in Las Palmas, Spain
Men's Laser
 : 
 : 
 : 
Women's Laser Radial
 : 
 : 
 : 
4–14 March: Finn European Championship in Barcelona, Spain
 : 
 : 
 : 
5–12 April: 470 European Championships in Mallorca, Spain
Men's 470
 : 
 : 
 : 
Women's 470
 : 
 : 
 : 
11–16 April: 49er & 49er FX European Championships in Barcelona, Spain
2–9 July: RS:X European Championships in Helsinki, Finland
Men's RS:X
 : 
 : 
 : 
Women's RS:X
 : 
 : 
 : 
16–24 September: Nacra 17 European Championship in Thessaloniki, Greece

North American championships
16–18 January: 470 North American Championships in Coconut Grove, United States
 : 
 : 
 : 
21–24 July: Laser North American Championships in Cascade Locks, United States
Men's Laser
 : 
 : 
 : 
Open Laser Radial
 : 
 : 
 : 
19–13 August: RS:X North American Championships in Kingston, Canada
26–28 August: 49er & 49er FX North American Championships in Newport, United States
Men's 49er
 : 
 : 
 : 
Women's 49er FX
 : 
 : 
 :

South American championships
10–13 February: 470 South American Championship in San Isidro, Argentina
11–14 July: 49er & 49er FX South American Championships in Rio de Janeiro, Brazil
Men's 49er
 : 
 : 
 : 
Women's 49er FX
 : 
 : 
 : 
27–31 July: RS:X South American Championships in São Paulo, Brazil

Other major events

America's Cup
25 July 2015 – 20 November 2016: 2015–16 America's Cup World Series
7 & 8 May: New York, United States
11 & 12 June: Chicago, United States
23 & 24 July: Portsmouth, United Kingdom
10 & 11 September: Toulon, France
19 & 20 November: Fukuoka, Japan

Extreme Sailing Series
16 February – 11 December: 2016 Extreme Sailing Series
 16–19 February: Act #1 in Muscat, Oman
 Winners:  Oman Air
 27 April – 1 May: Act #2 in Qingdao, China
 Winners:  Alinghi
 24–26 June: Act #3 in Cardiff, United Kingdom
 Winners:  Oman Air
 14–17 July: Act #4 in Hamburg, Germany
 Winners:  Oman Air
 25–28 August 2016: Act #5 in St. Petersburg, Russia
 Winners:  Alinghi
 22–25 October: Act #6 in Madeira Islands, Portugal
 Winners:  Alinghi
 6–9 October: Act #7 in Lisbon, Portugal
 Winners:  Alinghi
 8–11 December: Act #8 in Sydney, Australia
 Winners:  Alinghi

World Match Racing Tour
8 May 2015 – 30 January 2016: 2015 World Match Racing Tour
26–30 January: Monsoon Cup in Johor, Malaysia
2 March – 9 July: 2016 World Match Racing Tour
2–7 March: World Match Racing Tour Fremantle in Fremantle, Australia
5–10 April: Congressional Cup in Long Beach, United States
9–14 May: Danish Open in Copenhagen, Denmark
30 May – 4 June: World Match Racing Tour Newport in Newport, United States
4–9 July: Match Cup Sweden in Marstrand, Sweden

Other classes

World championships
7–17 April: Star World Championship in Miami, United States
3–9 June: Hansa World Championships in Medemblik, Netherlands
20–26 June: 470 World Junior Championship in Kiel, Germany
 Men's 470
 : 
 : 
 : 
 Women's 470
 : 
 : 
 : 
14–19 July: 6 Metre World Championship in Brunnen, Switzerland
15–23 July: 420 World Championships in Sanremo, Italy
22–29 July: OK World Championship in Quiberon, France
25–29 July: RS100 World Championship in Travemünde, Germany
30 July – 5 August: Dart 18 World Championships in Medemblik, Netherlands
30 July – 5 August: RS Tera World Championships in Santoña, Spain
22 August – 3 September: International 14 World Championships in Carnac, France
9–15 September: Formula Kite World Championships in Weifang, China
15–19 November: IKA KiteFoil GoldCup Final / World Championships (Open) in The Pearl, Qatar
12–17 December: RS:One World Championships in Dubai, United Arab Emirates
14–20 December: ISAF Youth Sailing World Championships in Auckland,  New Zealand

European championships
22–26 March: Zoom 8 European Championships in Palamos, Spain
30 April – 6 May: Soling European Championship in Traunsee, Austria
13–16 May: RS Feva European championship in Lipno, Czech Republic
16–22 May: IKA European Championship in Cagliari, Italy
22–26 June: Tornado European Championship in Cesenatico, Italy
23–26 June: J/70 European Championship in Kiel, Germany
 : 
 : 
 : 
25–29 June: B14 European Championships in Torbole, Italy
25 June – 1 July: One Metre European Championship in Vitoria-Gasteiz, Spain
29 June – 4 July: 29er European Championships in Tønsberg, Norway
2–9 July: RS:X Youth European Championship in Helsinki, Finland
5–13 July: F18 European Championship in Brest, France
7–10 July: Melges 32 European Championship in Riva del Garda, Italy
15–23 July: Optimist European Championship in Crotone, Italy
21–24 July: Sunfish European Championship in Marina di Grosseto, Italy
29 July – 6 August: 420 European Junior Championships & 470 European Junior Championships in Lake Balaton, Hungary
30 July – 6 August: Fireball European Championship in Brenzone, Italy
10–14 August: European Match Racing Championship in Christiansminde, Denmark
2–9 September: Melges 24 European Championships in Hyères, France
20–25 September: Snipe European Championship in Santiago de la Ribera, Spain

North American championships
14–18 August: 29er North American Championship in Kingston, Canada

South American championships
21–24 April: Soling North American Championship in Porto Alegre, Brazil

Other events
25 March –  2 April: Trofeo Princesa Sofia in Palma, Spain
9–14 May: Garda Trentino Olympic Week in Malcesine, Italy
24–28 May: Delta Lloyd Regatta in Medemblik, Netherlands
18–26 June: Kiel Week in Kiel, Germany
Men's 470 winners: 
Women's 470 winners: 
Men's 49er winners: 
Women's 49er FX winners: 
Men's Finn winner: 
Men's Laser winner: 
Women's Laser Radial winner: 
Mixed Nacra 17 winners: 
12 Metre winners: 
2.4 Metre winner: 
29er winners: 
420 winners: 
5.5 Metre winners: 
505 winners: 
Albin Ballad winners: 
Albin Express winners: 
Contender winner: 
Europe winner: 
Flying Dutchman winners: 
Formula 18 winners: 
Hobie 16 winners: 
J/24 winners: 
J/80 winners: 
Laser 4.7 winner: 
Laser Radial winner: 
Melges 24 winners: 
Musto Skiff winner: 
Nordic Folkboat winners: 
OK winner: 
Sonar winners: 
26 December – 30 December: 2016 Sydney to Hobart Yacht Race from Sydney, Australia to Hobart, Australia
 Line honours: , 1d 13h 31m 20s
 Handicap winners: , 2d 16h 13m 37s

Deaths
7 December – Paul Elvstrøm, 88, Danish Olympic sailor

References

 
Sailing by year